Enoch is a masculine given name. Notable people with the name include:

Given name

Musicians 
 Enoch Light (1907–1978), American musician and producer
 Enock Ondego (born 1930), Kenyan musician
 Enoch Sontonga (1873–1905), South African composer

Athletes (association football) 
 Enoch Adu (born 1998), Ghanaian footballer 
 Enoch Kofi Adu (born 1990), Ghanaian footballer 
 Enoch Agwanda (born 1994), Kenyan footballer
 Enoch Andoh (born 1993), Ghanaian footballer
 Enoch Banza (born 2000), Finnish footballer
 Enoch Gilchrist (1940-2008), Scottish footballer
 Enoch Hood (1861–1940), English footballer
 Enock Kwakwa (born 1994), Ghanaian footballer 
 Enock Kwateng (born 1997), French footballer
 Enoch Mort (1912-1999), Welsh footballer
 Enoch Mushagalusa (born 1999), Congolese footballer
 Enock Mwepu (born 1998), Zambian footballer
 Enoch Oteng (born 1988), Belgium footballer
 Enoch Rowley, English footballer
 Enoch Showunmi (born 1982), British football player
 Enoch West (1886-1965), English footballer

Athletes (other sports) 
 Enoch Olaoluwa Adegoke (born 2000), Nigerian sprinter
 Enoch Bagshaw (1884-1930), American football player and coach
 Enoch Brown (American football) (1892-1962), American college footballer
 Enoch Cook (1845-1927), English cricketer 
 Enoch Jeavons (1893-1967), English first-class cricketer 
 Enoch Lewis (cricketer) (born 1954), West Indies former cricketer
 Enoch J. Mills (1880-1935),  American sports coach
 Enoch Nkwe, South African cricketer
 Enoch Storer (1838-1880), English cricketer
 Enoch Tranter (1842-1910), English cricketer

Politicians 
 Enoch Baldwin (1822-1905), English iron founder and Liberal politician
 Enoch Dogolea (1951-2000), Liberian politician
 Enoch Dumbutshena (1920-2000), Zimbabwean judge and politician
 Enoch W. Eastman (1810-1885), American politician
 Enoch Edwards (trade unionist) (1852–1912), British trade unionist and politician
 Enoch L. Fancher (1817—1900), American lawyer and politician 
 Enoch Kelly Haney (1940-2022), American politician
 Enoch A. Holtwick (1881-1972), American politician
 Enoch Humphries (1922-2009), Scottish trade unionist
 Enoch Derant Lakoué (born 1944), Central African politician
 Enoch Louis Lowe (1820–1892), American politician
 Enoch Teye Mensah (born 1946), Ghanaian politician
 Enoch Morrell (1860-1934), Welsh trade unionist and politician
 Enoch Overton (1864-), British trade unionist
 Enoch H. Pardee (1829–1896), American medical doctor and politician
 Enoch Powell (1912–1998), British politician
 Enoch Salisbury (1819-1890), Welsh barrister, author and politician
 Enoch B. Talcott (1811-1868), American lawyer and politician
 Enoch Thorsgard (1917-2015), American politician
 Enoch H. Williams (1927-2012), American politician 
 Enoch Woodbridge (1750–1815), American politician and judge

Other 
 Enoch Adeboye (born 1942), Nigerian pastor
 Enoch Atuboyedia (born 1972), Nigerian bishop
 Enoch Marvin Banks (1877-1911), American historian and professor
 Enoch Barratt (1812-1895), Australian nursery proprietor
 Enoch Bolles (1883-1976), American painter 
 Enoch Chase (1809-1892), American physician, farmer, businessman, and politician
 Enoch White Clark (1802-1856), American founder of the financial firm E. W. Clark & Co.
 Enoch Crosby (1750–1835), American Revolutionary War soldier and spy
 Enoch Crowder (1859–1932), American general
 Enoch Edwards (1751-1802), American physician and a leading Patriot during the American Revolution
 Enoch Foster (1839-1913), American state judge
 Enoch Arden Holtwick, (1881–1972), American educator
 Enoch Hughes (1829-1893), English iron-master and pioneer in Australia and New Zealand
 Enoch L. Johnson (1883–1968), American political boss and racketeer
 Enoch Heinrich Kisch (1841-1918), Austrian balneologist and gynecologist 
 Enoch Lewis (1776-1856), American mathematician
 Enoch Lincoln (1788–1829), American representative
 Enoch Olinga (1926–1979), Ugandan missionary
 Enoch Greenleafe Parrott (1814-1879), American naval officer in the Mexican-American War and Civil War
 Enoch Wood Perry Jr. (1831–1915), American painter
 Enoch Poor (1736-1780), American brigadier general during the American Revolutionary War
 Enoch Pratt (1808–1896), American businessman and philanthropist
 Enoch J. Rector (1863–1957), American boxing film promoter and early cinema technician
 Enoch Seeman (1694–1744), Polish painter
 Enoch Beery Seitz (1846-1883), American mathematician
 Enoch Steen (1800-1880) American military officer and western explorer
 Enoch Thulin (1881–1919), Swedish pioneer
 Enoch Train (1801-1868), American shipowner and merchant
 Enoch Wedgwood (1813–1879), English potter
 Enoch Cobb Wines (1806-1879), American minister and prison reform advocate
 Enoch Wood (1759–1840), English potter
 Enoch Zundel ben Joseph (died 1867), Russian Talmudist

Fictional people
 Enoch, leader of the Forever Knights in the original series of Ben 10
 Enoch, protagonist in the video game El Shaddai: Ascension of the Metatron
 Enoch, guardian character in the video game OFF
 Enoch, a pumpkin-costumed character in the 2014 animated miniseries Over the Garden Wall
 Enoch, a silent brother in Cassandra Clare's The Shadowhunter Chronicles book series
 Aynuk and Ayli (Enoch and Eli), characters from the Black Country in the English midlands, featuring in local jokes
 Enoch Brae, a main character in Restless (2011 film)
 Enoch Cain, antagonist of novel From the Corner of His Eye
 Enoch Coltrane from the TV series Agents of S.H.I.E.L.D.
 Enoch Drebber, antagonist in the novel A Study in Scarlet
 Enoch Emery, character in Flannery O'Connor's novel Wise Blood
 Enoch Leng, character in the novels by Douglas Preston and Lincoln Child
 Enoch O'Connor, fictional character in Ransom Riggs' novel Miss Peregrine's Home for Peculiar Children
 Enoch Root, character from Neal Stephenson's novels The Baroque Cycle and Cryptonomicon
 Enoch Samways, a character in Roald Dahl's novel Danny, the Champion of the World
 Enoch Soames, eponymous protagonist in a short story by Max Beerbohm
 Enoch Snow, ambitious fishing tycoon from the musical CAROUSEL
 Enoch Malachi "Nucky" Thompson, protagonist of the television series Boardwalk Empire

English masculine given names
Masculine given names